is a railway station in the town of Kanegasaki, Iwate Prefecture, Japan, operated by the East Japan Railway Company (JR East).

Lines
Rokuhara Station is served by the Tōhoku Main Line, and is located 481.1 rail kilometers from the terminus of the line at Tokyo Station.

Station layout
The station has an island platform and a single side platform serving three tracks, connected to the station building by a footbridge. The station is unattended.

Platforms

History
Rokuhara Station was elevated from a signal stop to a passenger station on 1 February 1937. The station was absorbed into the JR East network upon the privatization of the Japanese National Railways (JNR) on 1 April 1987.

Passenger statistics
In fiscal 2017, the station was used by an average of 233 passengers daily (boarding passengers only).

Surrounding area
Kitakami River
 
Tōhoku Expressway

See also
 List of Railway Stations in Japan

References

External links

  

Railway stations in Iwate Prefecture
Tōhoku Main Line
Railway stations in Japan opened in 1937
Kanegasaki, Iwate
Stations of East Japan Railway Company